Henicorhynchus is a genus of cyprinid fish that occurs in Southeast Asia with one species extending into China.  There are currently 7 species in this genus.

Species
 Henicorhynchus caudimaculatus (Fowler, 1934)
 Henicorhynchus horai (Bănărescu, 1986)
 Henicorhynchus inornatus (Roberts, 1997)
 Henicorhynchus lineatus H. M. Smith, 1945
 Henicorhynchus lobatus H. M. Smith, 1945
 Henicorhynchus ornatipinnis (Roberts, 1997)
 Henicorhynchus siamensis'' (Sauvage, 1881) (Siamese mud carp)

References

 

 
Cyprinid fish of Asia
Cyprinidae genera